Deswa is a 2011 Indian Bhojpuri language film written and directed by Nitin Chandra. The film is a social drama - crime thriller Bhojpuri genre. The first film to be produced by actress Neetu Chandra. The film introduces new actors Ajay Kumar, Deepak Singh and Kranti Prakash Jha in lead roles along with critically acclaimed actor Pankaj Jha and Ashish Vidyarthi.
 
In 2010 Neetu Chandra had expressed a hope that it would move beyond the limited release that is common for Bhojpuri films and instead be seen throughout India and perhaps also abroad. She intends that the film would employ multilingual dialogue - Bhojpuri, English, Telugu and Hindi - as well as being dubbed into Tamil and Marathi in order to extend its appeal. She believ that "With Deswa, we would be redefining the very face of Bhojpuri cinema." 
Deswa is the first Bhojpuri film in 50 years to get selected at Indian Panorama section of International Film Festival of India, which was enough to support the vision of Neetu Chandra. Deswa was also invited by IIM - A and had selection at South Asian Film Festival, Habitat World Film Festival, Montage Film Festival, International Film Festival of Fiji, Bhojpuri Film Festival and latest was International Film Festival of South Asia (IFFSA), Toronto, Canada and it is still being invited at several National and International Film Festivals.
This film is a part of inaugural Bhojpuri Film Festival 2017 at Ahiri Fort Auditorium Delhi. Director Nitin Chandra is also taking part in this festival.

The film was screened in Patna, Bihar on 20 November 2011. This was attended by the cast and by politicians such as Nitish Kumar, the Chief Minister of the state. It received favourable reviews from critics at film festivals, such as the International Film Festival of India in Goa. It was also screened in South Asian Film Festival of India, Montage Film Festival, Habitat World Film Festival and International Film Festival of Fiji. The Hindi-language variant of this film was released in October 2015 under the name Once Upon A Time In Bihar.

Plot 
The film deals with contemporary issues affecting youths. It begins in 2005 with a student protest during the corrupt administration, intended to free the characters played by Ajay Kumar and Deepak Singh. The film goes in a flashback of these two prisoners.

Singh is a temporary Government teacher who twice passed the written entrance examination for the Indian Police Service but was not selected for employment. Kumar is a brilliant student but from a poor family, which meant that he could not afford the 200,000 bribe that was necessary in order to secure a job. He has a friend who is of a lower caste, which adds to his woes because the relationship caused friction with both his older brother and society generally. While Kumar needs money for the bribe and to pay a dowry on the marriage of his sister, his friend needs finance to start a roadside tea stall and so escape the need to continue working for his cruel employer.

The young men plan the most unusual idea and, as the destiny would have, fail. Deswa is a 2-hour 10-minute film which will engage you through its picturesque cinematography, songs by the great Sonu Nigam, Shreya Ghoshal, Sunidhi Chauhan, Sharda Sinha, Bharat Sharma Vyas, Mika, Swanand Kirkire and a new singer from Bihar, Prabhakar Pandey and edge-of-the-seat thrilling scenes.

Cast
Ajay Kumar
Deepak Singh
Kranti Prakash Jha 
Arti Puri 
Neetu Chandra (Special Appearance in a folk dance choreographed by Ganesh Acharya.)

Soundtrack 
The soundtrack was released on the T-Series label and includes songs performed by singers such as Sonu Nigam, Sharda Sinha, Shreya Ghoshal, Mika and Sunidhi Chauhan. The music director is Ashutosh Singh.

Production
The film was filmed mostly in Bihar. Locations included Buxar district, Patna and Andhra Pradesh.

Reception
The film received good response at the time of token when release in  theatres. It was mainly released to make the film eligible for National Film Awards. A change in the screening times caused the audience numbers to rise. Nitin Chandra commented that "she is confident that the film would pick up gradually, although, apart from Neetu's dance number, it does not have any popular star, but great actors. The first day response during the trial screening was not that great probably because people prefer not too catch the morning show during winter". The whole idea is to release the film in both Hindi and Bhojpuri versions was taken later. The film also screened at the International Film Festival of India in Goa where it received favourable reviews from critics.

Despite an international presence of a Bhojpuri film, no one from the Bihar or film fraternity has come forward to get this film released.

References

2011 films
Films set in Bihar
Indian multilingual films
2010s Bhojpuri-language films